Hampton Gay and Poyle is a civil parish in Oxfordshire, England. It was formed in 1932 by merger of the parishes of Hampton Gay and Hampton Poyle and as at 2011 had 141 residents across 6.11 km2

References

Sources

External links

Hampton Gay and Poyle Community Website

Civil parishes in Oxfordshire